"Mil Pedazos" ("Thousand Pieces") is a song performed by Colombian singer-songwriter Juanes for his sixth studio album Loco de Amor (2014). Written by the singer, and the member of the Mexican band Café Tacuba, Emmanuel Del Real, and produced by Juanes with the collaboration of Steve Lillywhite, Universal Music Latino released the song as the second single from Loco de Amor on March 7, 2014.

Production and release 
"Mil Pedazos" was written by Juanes himself and Emmanuel Del Real, member of the Mexican band Café Tacuba. Production of the song was helmed by Juanes and co-produced by Steve Lillywhite. Matty Green engineered the song and mixed it together with Lillywhite. "Mil Pedazos" was recorded in two studios: Henson Recording Studios in Hollywood, and Perfect Sound Studios in California.  The song was included on Juanes' sixth studio album Loco de Amor, which was released worldwide on April 11, 2014.

Chart performance 
In Colombia, "Mil Pedazos" debuted at number 10 on the National-Report ending April 14, 2014. In the United States, the song debuted at number 30 on the Billboard Latin Pop Songs chart, and in Mexico on the Billboard Mexican Airplay chart peaked at number 33.

Credits and personnel 
Recording
Recorded at Henson Recording Studios, Hollywood, California and Perfect Sound Studios, Los Angeles, California.

Personnel
Songwriting – Juanes, Emmanuel Del Real
Production – Juanes, Steve Lillywhite
Vocal engineering and recording – Matty Green
Mixing – Steve Lillywhite, Matty Green

Credits adapted from the liner notes of Loco de Amor, Universal Music Latino, Parce Music LLC (BMI).

Charts

Release history

References

External links

2014 songs
2014 singles
Juanes songs
Songs written by Juanes
Song recordings produced by Steve Lillywhite
Spanish-language songs
Universal Music Latino singles